The US Post Office-Woburn Center Station is a historic post office building at 1 Abbott Street in Woburn, Massachusetts.  The single story Classical Revival building was built out of sandstone in 1911.  It is nine bays in width, with a central portico supported by Doric columns sheltering the main entrance.  The building has a standing seam metal hip roof with a flat middle section.  The cornice has dentil molding, with a parapet above.

The building was listed on the National Register of Historic Places in 1987.

See also 

National Register of Historic Places listings in Middlesex County, Massachusetts
List of United States post offices

References 

Woburn
Buildings and structures in Middlesex County, Massachusetts
National Register of Historic Places in Middlesex County, Massachusetts